In molecular biology, snoRNA Z37 is a member of the C/D class of snoRNA which contain the C (UGAUGA) and D (CUGA) box motifs. Z37 acts as a methylation guide for 5.8S ribosomal RNA. This family contains a putative snoRNA found in the intron of the receptor for activated C kinase (RACK1) gene in mammals identified by the Rfam database. This family also includes human snoRNAs U96a and U96b and the apicomplexan snoRNA snr39b.

References

External links 
 

Small nuclear RNA